Disneyland Dream (1956) is a home movie made by Robbins and Meg Barstow that documents their family's free trip to the newly opened Disneyland. The one-week trip was a prize they won in a contest sponsored by Scotch tape. The movie was shot with a 16 mm handheld camera. It lasts approximately 35 minutes. An audio track was added to the film in 1995.

The Barstows lived in Wethersfield, Connecticut. They flew to California with TWA and stayed at the Huntington-Sheraton Hotel in Pasadena. They visited other Southern California locations, including Knott's Berry Farm, Hollywood, Grauman's Chinese Theatre, Beverly Hills, Universal Studios, Will Rogers' home and Catalina Island on their July 1956 trip.

Comedian Steve Martin who worked at Disneyland as a child, appears briefly at 20:20 into the film, selling programs as he walks left to right in the lower right part of the frame, dressed in top hat, dark vest, and a pink striped shirt.

National Film Registry
In 2008, Disneyland Dream was selected for preservation in the United States National Film Registry by the Library of Congress as being "culturally, historically, or aesthetically significant". The National Film Registry cited its "fantastical historical snapshots" of early Southern California and the budding importance of the home movies in "American cultural studies as they provide priceless and authentic record of time and place."

Commenting on the selection of Disneyland Dream into the National Film Registry, Robbins Barstow stated: "I think it's because it gives a picture of a representative American middle class family that's functional".

Notes

External links
 Disneyland Dream essay by Liz Coffey on the National Film Registry website 
 Disneyland Dream essay by Daniel Eagan in America's Film Legacy: The Authoritative Guide to the Landmark Movies in the National Film Registry, A&C Black, 2010 , pages 518–520 
 Download of the Home Movie
 
 New York Times obituary of Mr. Barstow, November 13, 2010

1956 films
American documentary films
United States National Film Registry films
Disneyland Resort
1956 documentary films
Amateur filmmaking
Disneyland
Knott's Berry Farm
1950s English-language films
1950s American films